Rashakai railway station is located in Pakistan.

See also
 List of railway stations in Pakistan
 Pakistan Railways

References

Railway stations in Mardan District
Railway stations on Nowshera–Dargai Railway Line
Defunct railway stations in Mardan District